Lake Stella is a  lake that is located in Alger County, Michigan in the Hiawatha National Forest.  Other nearby lakes include Round Lake, Stoner Lake, West Branch Lake, Hugaboom Lake, Blue Lake, Ironjaw Lake, Ostrande Lake, Corner-Straits Chain and Toms Lake.

See also
List of lakes in Michigan

References 

Lakes of Alger County, Michigan
Lakes of Michigan